Cryptotermes perforans is a species of dry wood termite of the genus Cryptotermes. It is endemic to Sri Lanka. It is found in dead wood of Syzygium cumini, attack on other dressed timber and wooden furniture.

References

External links
Economic and Ecological Significance of Arthropods in Diversified Ecosystems

Termites
Insects described in 1932
Arthropods of Sri Lanka